Piece by Piece is the second studio album by British-Georgian jazz and blues singer Katie Melua. It was released on 26 September 2005 by Dramatico Records. In the United Kingdom, the album debuted at #1 with 120,459 copies sold in its first week.

Its first single, Mike Batt's song "Nine Million Bicycles", became Melua's first top five hit in the UK and caused controversy when science writer Simon Singh said the lyrics "demonstrates a deep ignorance of cosmology and no understanding of the scientific method". After an amusing and good-natured debate in the Press Melua eventually recorded Singh's version, which both agreed was scientifically accurate and musically pathetic.

The second single was a double A-side comprising "I Cried for You" and a cover of The Cure's "Just Like Heaven". The former song was written after Melua met the writer of The Holy Blood and the Holy Grail and is about Jesus and Mary Magdalene, while the latter was recorded for the soundtrack to the film Just Like Heaven. The single peaked outside the UK top twenty, and the album's third single, "Spider's Web" (which Melua wrote when she was eighteen, during the Iraq War) did not reach the top forty.

Melua wrote the title song "Piece By Piece" after she broke up with her boyfriend Luke Pritchard, and "Half Way up the Hindu Kush" was written by Katie and Mike Batt playing on the unusualness of the title phrase, which cropped up in a conversation about scarves on a train journey. Alongside covers of "Blues in the Night" and Canned Heat's "On the Road Again", the album includes "Thank you, Stars", which was previously released as a B-side on Melua's debut single "The Closest Thing To Crazy" in 2003.

The album was re-released in 2006, as Piece by Piece: Special Bonus Edition, with three additional tracks and a bonus DVD with concert Moment by Moment and promo videos.

Track listing

Variants
A special edition for Spanish department store El Corte Inglés had additional tracks - Spanish language versions of "Closest Thing to Crazy" ("Esa Clase de Locura") and "Faraway Voice" (aka "Otra vez tu").

The American release had two extra tracks (but not the Special Bonus edition tracks), "Jack's Room" and "Market Day in Guernica".

Charts

Weekly charts

Year-end charts

All-time charts

Certifications and sales

Personnel
Katie Melua - vocals
Katie Melua, Chris Spedding, Jim Cregan - guitar
Mike Batt (Katie Melua on "I Do Believe in Love") - piano
Tim Harries - bass
Henry Spinetti - drums
Dominic Glover - trumpet
Mike Darcy - violin
Martin Ditcham, Chris Karan - percussion
Paul Jones - harmonica ("Blues in the Night")
Adrian Brett - ethnic flute ("Nine Million Bicycles")
Peter Knight - mandolin ("Thankyou, Stars")
Craig Pruess - sitar ("Halfway up the Hindu Kush")
The Irish Film Orchestra - orchestra; conductor: Mike Batt

Production
 Producer: Mike Batt
 Engineer: Steve Sale
 Arranger: Mike Batt
 Photography: Simon Fowler

References

External links
 Katie Melua website

Katie Melua albums
2005 albums
Albums produced by Mike Batt